Captain William Spencer Beaumont (29 May 1848 – 2 August 1926) was a British army officer and a member of the London County Council.

Beaumont was the grandson of John Thomas Barber Beaumont, who raised the Queen Victoria's Rifles in 1803 during the Napoleonic Wars. His parents were John Augustus Beaumont
and Caroline Mary Beaumont, who owned Wimbledon Park. Beaumont served as a captain in the 14th King's Hussars cavalry regiment in the British Army. In 1876, he married Honoria Cooper. In 1889 he was an elected a member of the London County Council to represent Tower Hamlets, Stepney. In 1890, Beaumont petitioned Ecclesiastical Commissioners for a Church site.

Beaumont was the father of Dudley Beaumont (1874–1918), who married Sibyl Collings, later Dame of Sark. His grandson was Francis William Beaumont (1903–1941) and his great-great-grandson is the 23rd Seigneur of Sark, Christopher Beaumont.

References 

14th King's Hussars officers
Members of London County Council
1848 births
1926 deaths
People from Westminster